The pampiniform plexus (from Latin pampinus, a tendril, + forma, form) is a venous plexus – a network of many small veins found in the human male spermatic cord, and the suspensory ligament of the ovary. In the male, it is formed by the union of multiple testicular veins from the back of the testis and tributaries from the epididymis.

In the male
The veins of the plexus ascend along the spermatic cord in front of the vas deferens. Below the superficial inguinal ring they unite to form three or four veins, which pass along the inguinal canal, and, entering the abdomen through the deep inguinal ring, coalesce to form two veins. These again unite to form a single vein, the testicular vein, which opens on the right side into the inferior vena cava, at an acute angle, and on the left side into the left renal vein, at a right angle. The pampiniform plexus forms the chief mass of the cord.

In addition to its function in venous return from the testes, the pampiniform plexus also plays a role in the temperature regulation of the testes.  It acts as a countercurrent heat exchanger, cooling blood in adjacent arteries. An abnormal enlargement of the pampiniform plexus is a medical condition called varicocele.

In the female
In females, the pampiniform plexus drains the ovaries. The right ovary drains from the plexus to the ovarian vein and then to the inferior vena cava. However, the left ovary drains from the plexus to the left ovarian vein, and from there drains to the left renal vein before emptying into the inferior vena cava.

See also 
 Rete mirabile, vascular countercurrent heat- and mass-exchanging structures found in many vertebrate organs

References

External links
  - "Inguinal Region, Scrotum and Testes: Veins"
  - "Male Reproductive System: spermatic cord, pampiniform plexus"
  - "Spermatic cord"
 
 
 Diagram at Rutgers

Veins of the torso
Scrotum